Spirit House, also known as Timothy Brown House or Brown's Hall, is a historic home located at Georgetown in Madison County, New York. It was built about 1865 and is essentially a square, wood-frame structure. The exterior features two-by-fours arranged vertically and scalloped at regular intervals. The use of the scallop pattern gives the Spirit House a highly textured surface and it is almost impossible to discern how it is constructed without close inspection. It also features a three tiered cornice with downward pointing keys. It was constructed as a residence and for meetings of Spiritualists in a large hall on the second floor.

It was listed on the National Register of Historic Places in 2006.

References

External links

Properties of religious function on the National Register of Historic Places in New York (state)
Historic American Buildings Survey in New York (state)
Houses on the National Register of Historic Places in New York (state)
Houses completed in 1865
Houses in Madison County, New York
National Register of Historic Places in Madison County, New York